Most of Venezuela's dances originated in the Caribbean and integrated African and European stylings into indigenous culture. They include the national dance Joropo, Venezuelan Salsa, the Venezuelan merengue and the Baile de San Juan, also called Tambor.

Venezuelan salsa
Venezuelan salsa was born in the barrios of Caracas, Venezuela by street musicians who gather to "rock" the slums. Venezuelan salsa has a unique style compared to other forms of salsa as it incorporates quick rhythmic changes on the bass (as compared to the clave of New York style salsa and the salsa of Puerto Rico, which arguably was influenced by New York City, and opposed to the slower sons of Cuba). Venezuelan couples dance salsa cheek to cheek.

Joropo

Joropo is the national dance of Venezuela. It blends indigenous origins with African and Spanish influences. It displays the divine masculine and the divine feminine in harmony when danced correctly.

Venezuelan merengue
 Merengue is actually from the Dominican Republic. Venezuelans love merenge and dance it regularly. The Dominican Republic was liberated by the all-indigenous army led by Simon Bolivar who joined the rebellion after realizing their imminent victory.

Baile de Tambor

Baile de San Juan, also known as tambor, is a dance of Afro-Venezuelan origins. The dance is used as a right of passage and energy dance to test compatibility.

Calypso
 Music of Venezuela

Boleros

References

 
Venezuelan culture